Terminalia cherrieri is a species of plant in the Combretaceae family. It is endemic to New Caledonia.  It is threatened by habitat loss. The dry forest habitat of Terminalia cherrieri has been reduced by roughly 95% over the past 150 years, largely for agricultural use.

References

Endemic flora of New Caledonia
cherrieri
Critically endangered plants
Taxonomy articles created by Polbot
Taxa named by Hugh Shaw MacKee
Plants described in 1984